Field of Fire is the second solo album by former Television guitarist Richard Lloyd.  It was released in 1985, six years after his solo debut, Alchemy.  The album was recorded in Stockholm, Sweden, backed mostly by Swedish musicians.

The liner notes state that the album is "dedicated to the lodestone".  The album sleeve also includes a quote from St. Paul's epistle to the Romans (chapter 15, verse 13, NIV): "May the God of hope fill you with all joy and peace as you trust in him that you may overflow with hope by the power of the Holy Spirit."

Track listing
All songs written by Richard Lloyd except as noted.

Side one
"Watch Yourself" - 3:10
"Losin' Anna" - 2:57
"Soldier Blue" - 4:04
"Backtrack" - 3:07
"Keep On Dancin" - 6:14

Side two
"Pleading" (Lloyd, Keith Patchel) - 3:57
"Lovin' Man" - 3:07
"Black to White" - 4:38
"Field of Fire" - 8:30

Personnel
Richard Lloyd - vocals, guitars, bass on "Soldier Blue", harmonica on "Backtrack"
Keith Patchel - guitars, backing vocals on "Losin' Anna"
Anders Åström - bass
Thomas Johansson - bass on "Losin' Anna", "Pleading" and "Black to White"
Christian Falk - bass on "Keep On Dancin"
Peter Olsen - drums
Ulf Sandquist - drums on "Soldier Blue", "Backtrack" and "Field of Fire"
Per Eriksson - drums on "Keep On Dancin"
Stefan Glaumann - percussion on "Keep On Dancin"
Technical
Keith Patchel - production assistance
Christer Åkerberg, Stefan Glaumann - engineer

References

1986 albums
Richard Lloyd (guitarist) albums